Singapore's public schools come under the purview of the Ministry of Education. Singapore has many primary schools and secondary schools, as well as junior colleges, centralised institutes, polytechnics and universities providing tertiary education.

Under the Compulsory Education Act which came into effect on 1 January 2003, all children have to start attending primary school at the age of 7. It is a criminal offence to fail to do so; however, parents may apply for an exemption from the Ministry of Education for their child to be homeschooled or to attend full-time religious institutions.

Primary schools

Secondary schools

Junior Colleges and Millennia Institute
Below is a list of schools offering a two or three-year pre-university education in Singapore, along with the special programmes offered by the schools. The year of establishment in this article reflects the year in which the pre-university programme is implemented, particularly for the Integrated Programme High Schools. All pre-university programmes in Singapore are mixed-sex in tandem with the Ministry of Education's (MOE) requirements. These schools can be divided into two groups: junior colleges and centralised institutes.

Junior colleges (JC)
These offer two-year courses leading to the Singapore-Cambridge GCE 'A' Level or International Baccalaureate examinations.

Millennia Institute (MI)
The only centralized institute in Singapore is Millennia Institute (MI), which offers a three-year course leading to the GCE A-level examination in arts, science, and commerce.

Abbreviations
MOE-based programmes:
AEP = Art Elective Programme
MEP = Music Elective Programme
RSP = Regional Studies Programme
HSP = Humanities Scholarship and Programme
CLEP = Language Elective Programme (Chinese)
MLEP = Language Elective Programme (Malay)
TLEP = Language Elective Programme (Tamil)
ELEP = Language Elective Programme (English)
BSP = Bicultural Studies Programme

Polytechnics

Institute of Technical Education (ITE)
The Institute of Technical Education campuses were reorganized under the "collegiate system" into three major colleges around the island, a regrouping and renaming exercise which took effect on 1 January 2005. ITE College East was the first to open in Simei in January 2005, and the existing "ITE East Network" campuses were renamed as "ITE College Central" campuses, to be replaced by a new campus in Ang Mo Kio. "ITE West Network" campuses were renamed "ITE College West" campuses, and their new campus will be at Choa Chu Kang.

ITE College Central (Regional Campus at Ang Mo Kio)
ITE College West (Regional Campus at Choa Chu Kang)
ITE College East (Regional Campus at Simei)

University of the Arts Singapore

In March 2021, Minister for Education Lawrence Wong announced that Singapore’s first arts university will be established in an alliance between the Nanyang Academy of Fine Arts and LASALLE College of the Arts, in a system akin to the University of the Arts, London. The formation of the University of the Arts Singapore (UAS) will see both colleges under the umbrella university be given degree-awarding powers independent of their current foreign partners, where the current long-distance degrees are issued through foreign universities. Singaporeans and permanent residents (PRs) enrolled in the approved degree programmes at the university of the arts will pay subsidised fees, comparable to those at autonomous universities here.

The seventh local university of Singapore will be the only publicly-funded private university other than the now defunct and restructured UniSIM in Singapore, and also the only university of the arts with its own degree-conferring power in Singapore slated to open in 2024.

Constituent colleges:
 Nanyang Academy of Fine Arts
 LASALLE College of the Arts

Universities

Specialised tertiary schools

Government-Affiliated
BCA Academy
Singapore Aviation Academy
IP Academy

Others
Aventis School of Management
Jewellery Design and Management International School
Orita Sinclair School of Design and Music
MAD School
Intercultural Theatre Institute

Language Centres

Cambridge Institute (Singapore)
Ministry of Education Language Centre

Umar Pulavar Tamil Language Centre

Special education schools

Rainbow Centre (operates Margaret Drive Special School)

Pathlight School

International schools

Supplementary schools
 (JSS; シンガポール日本語補習授業校 Shingapōru Nihongo Hoshū Jugyō Kō) - a Japanese supplementary school

References

External links
Ministry of Education Singapore P1 Registration (in English)
Singapore Government Directory
Singapore Digital Homeschooling
SkillsFuture Singapore and Workforce Singapore
Committee for Private Education

 
Schools